Supergirl (Kara Zor-El) or Linda Lee is a fictional character portrayed by Helen Slater in the feature film Supergirl. Released in 1984, it was produced by Ilya and Alexander Salkind, and is an adaption of the original comic book character, Supergirl.

Supergirl was a spin-off from the popular 1978 film Superman, and Marc McClure reprises his role of Jimmy Olsen. Christopher Reeve was slated to have a cameo as Superman but he ultimately backed out of the production, although his likeness appears in a photo.

Lucy Lane also appears as a friend and schoolmate of Supergirl's alter-ego Linda Lee. Actress Maureen Teefy portrayed her as a peppy teenager with a burgeoning relationship with Jimmy Olsen vaguely mimicking their relationship in the comics. Meanwhile, Faye Dunaway (who received top billing) played the primary villain, Selena.

Development and execution
Upon gaining the film rights for Superman: The Movie in 1978, Alexander Salkind and his son, Ilya, also purchased the rights to the character of Supergirl, should any sequel or spin-off occur. After the critical and commercial disappointment of Superman III, the Salkinds opted to make a Supergirl movie to freshen the franchise. Ilya later recounted, "[It was] something different, to an extent. I thought it was a very different area to explore."

Supergirl was originally planned for Superman III, in a treatment written by Ilya Salkind. In a bizarre twist from the comics, Supergirl was to be the surrogate daughter of Brainiac (who later is possessively in love with her) who falls in love with Superman, who in the film was to be portrayed as her lover instead of cousin, contrary to all previous depictions. Brainiac would have discovered Supergirl in the same way that Superman was found by the Kents.

The producers attempted, and failed, to get the services of Richard Lester, who had directed Superman III and had completed the second film after their dismissal of original director Richard Donner. Robert Wise also turned down the director's chair. But French filmmaker Jeannot Szwarc, whose best-known work up to that time was mainly in television and directing Jaws 2, was ultimately chosen after a meeting with Christopher Reeve, who had complimented the Somewhere in Time director. Szwarc sought advice from Donner over some technical aspects of the production.

Hundreds of actresses tested for the role of Supergirl/Linda, among them Demi Moore and Brooke Shields. Shields and Moore were both ultimately rejected by both Ilya and Szwarc, who had both wanted an unknown actress, and they instead signed Helen Slater. Slater was paid $75,000 for what would be her first motion picture role. 

Slater trained for three to four months with Alf Joint, who was the same trainer for Christopher Reeve. According to Slater, she gained about 20 pounds after initially being at around 118 pounds. Besides weight lifting, Joint had Slater trampolining, and horseback riding, and fencing and swimming and any kind of sporty thing that you could do. Slater in particular, had to learn how to go up in the air into a somersault and swan dive. When reflecting on her time making the film, she said that it was an incredible adventure living in England for a year and just having an extraordinary wind at her back and doing this kind of part of being a superhero.

During her screentest as Supergirl, Helen Slater wore a red headband. Supergirl's comic book counterpart changed her costume in 1983 to tie-in to the upcoming movie. Ultimately however, the filmmakers decided to just adapt the classic costume. </ref>

Portrayal and characteristics
Its plot concerns Supergirl, Superman's cousin, leaving her isolated Kryptonian community of Argo City for Earth in an effort to retrieve the unique "Omegahedron", which has fallen into the hands of the evil witch Selena (Faye Dunaway). Selena banishes Kara to the Phantom Zone by means of a summoned crystal shard. The crystal transports her to a barren, desolate world where it shatters, casting her to the ground. This depiction of the Phantom Zone suggests that the crystal shard seen in the first two Superman movies is not the Phantom Zone itself, but simply a vehicle that takes prisoners to this desolate wasteland which is referred to as the Phantom Zone, similar to the later Smallville TV series.

Once in the zone, Kara loses her powers as Supergirl and becomes an ordinary mortal. In this movie, it is also revealed that there is a way out of the Zone, although the trip to the exit portal is extremely dangerous and would almost lead to certain death. Kara is guided to this portal by Zaltar, another Kryptonian who was banished there. Kara is successfully able to transport herself back to Earth using this portal, although Zaltar is killed in the attempt. Following Kara's escape, the defeated Selena and her henchwoman Bianca are both banished to the Phantom Zone.

Role in the franchise
In 2010, Helen Slater wrote a Supergirl story titled "A Hero's Journey" which appeared in the fiftieth issue of the fifth volume of the Supergirl comic book. For the Supergirl TV series of the same name, Slater this time portrayed Supergirl's adoptive mother Eliza Danvers. She also made three guest appearances on the series Smallville (2007–2010) as Clark Kent's biological mother Lara. Jonathan and Martha Kent appear in the web series DC Super Hero Girls, in the movie Hero of the Year, voiced by Dean Cain and Helen Slater.

In 2019, Slater said when about how much special effects had changed when she played Supergirl in the early 1980s: "In fact, the special effects have not changed that much since 1982, or we were shooting in 1983. Certainly the CGI, they can make Melissa Benoist now, she can pop in and out. That’s extraordinary how they can do the flying stuff but there’s still the wirework". Slater also noted that while cameras may have gotten smaller and superhero-productions film a lot more on green screen stages, some of filmmaking haven’t changed either such as wirework or sound.

Whereas the Supergirl television series upon its 2015 debut, explored modern day feminist issues and the way women are expected to express anger differently than men, Slater said that the extent of her film’s exploration of gender issues was the scene in which she fends off some truck drivers who were trying to reach up her skirt.

Reception
The movie performed poorly at the box office and failed to impress critics or audiences; Peter O'Toole received a Golden Raspberry Award nomination for Worst Actor for his performance, while Faye Dunaway received a Worst Actress nomination for hers. Prior to its release, Supergirl was expected to be the first film of a series, and Helen Slater had a contract for three films, but Supergirl'''s failure at the box office cancelled plans for a Supergirl II. Even though the film performed poorly at the box office, Helen Slater was nominated for a Saturn Award.

Both Rita Kempley and Paul Attanasio of The Washington Post gave it positive marks. John Grant, writing in The Encyclopedia of Fantasy, was more positive about the film, describing Slater as "an exceptionally charming Supergirl" and wrote that Supergirl had some "excellent—and excellently realized—flights of imagination." Grant criticized the "inconsistent" characterization of Slater's characters. Summing up, he stated while Supergirl "was less than the sum of its parts, not all of those parts are insignificant."

In 1985, DC Comics named Slater as one of the honorees in the company's 50th anniversary publication Fifty Who Made DC Great'' for her work on the Supergirl film.

References

External links

Hollywood Flashback: In 1984, Helen Slater Fought Faye Dunaway as 'Supergirl'
Behind The Scenes of Supergirl Movie (1984)
35 thoughts I had while watching Supergirl (1984) | SYFY WIRE 
The Supergirl (1984) Movie: Better Than Wonder Woman 1984?
Geekery: DC Movie Marathon – From Mole Men to Nuclear Man
THE SCREEN: HELEN SLATER AS 'SUPERGIRL' 
ComicsAlliance Reviews 'Supergirl' (1984), Part One
ERIC'S BAD MOVIES: SUPERGIRL (1984)
Class of 1984: "Supergirl" | THE FILM YAP
Stars of 1984’s ‘Supergirl’ Reflect on Film Ahead of Warner Archive Blu-ray Release
Things You Didn't Know About Supergirl Movie | ScreenRant 
FLASHBACK: SUPERGIRL (1984)
Supergirl movie review & film summary (1984) | Roger Ebert

Film characters introduced in 1984
Female characters in film
DC Comics American superheroes
DC Comics characters who can move at superhuman speeds
DC Comics characters with accelerated healing
DC Comics characters with superhuman strength
DC Comics extraterrestrial superheroes
DC Comics female superheroes
Kryptonians
Superman in other media
Supergirl
Superman (1978 film series) characters